Anacamptis palustris is a species of orchid. It is found in Europe, North Africa and western Asia. This orchid is native to Western and Central Europe, the Mediterranean region, the Balearic Islands, Turkey, Western Asia, Algeria and Tunisia in North Africa, and Saudi Arabia.

It is a perennial herbaceous flower, and can be found in humid pastures, wet meadows and swamps. It prefers calcareous soils in full sun. It flowers in spring. The species epithet palustris is Latin for "of the marsh" and indicates its common habitat.

Subspecies 
Subspecies of Anacamptis palustris include:
Anacamptis palustris subsp. elegans
Anacamptis palustris subsp. palustris
Anacamptis palustris subsp. robusta — Mallorca (Balearic Islands), northern Algeria, Tunisia.

References

External links 
 
 

palustris
Flora of Central Asia
Flora of North Africa
Flora of the Caucasus
Flora of Western Asia
Flora of Saudi Arabia
Orchids of Europe
Matorral shrubland